Saltholmen may refer to:

 Saltholmen, Gothenburg, Sweden
 Saltholmen Lighthouse in Lillesand, Norway

See also 
 Saltholm, an island in Denmark